The Theatre of Clunia Sulpicia is a Roman theatre in the ancient city of Colonia Clunia Sulpicia, in what is now province of Burgos, northern Spain. Built on a hill called Alto de Castro (at a height of ), it is located between the modern-day villages of Coruña del Conde and Peñalba de Castro, in the south of the province of Burgos.

The edifice was built under the reign of Emperor Tiberius to monumentalize the most important city, along with Asturica Augusta, of the Douro basin.  The city was in the province of Hispania Citerior Tarraconensis

The theatre is the most significant structure to survive at Clunia. Carved out of rock, it had a capacity of 10,000 spectators, which made it one of the biggest of its time in Hispania. It was intended to house performances of theatrical works of the classical period.

See also
 List of Roman theatres

Notes

External links 
 
Website of the archaeological site of Clunia
Website about Clunia - Coruña del Conde
Images of the Roman City of Clunia
Images of the Theatre of Clunia Sulpicia (Spanish)
Clunia Sulpica

Buildings and structures completed in the 1st century
Clunia
Buildings and structures in the Province of Burgos
Tourist attractions in Castile and León